Octonodula inumbrata is a moth of the family Gelechiidae. It was described by Edward Meyrick in 1914. It is found in South Africa.

The wingspan is 12–15 mm. The forewings are dark purplish fuscous, with the tips of the scales pale purplish grey. The stigmata are obscure, cloudy and dark fuscous, the plical obliquely before the first discal. There is a small indistinct grey-whitish spot on the costa at two-thirds. The hindwings are dark grey.

References

Endemic moths of South Africa
Moths described in 1914
Anacampsinae